Latvia competed at the 2022 Winter Olympics in Beijing, China, from 4 to 20 February 2022.

Lauris Dārziņš and Elīza Tīruma were the country's flagbearer during the opening ceremony. Meanwhile bobsledder Matīss Miknis was the flagbearer during the closing ceremony.

Competitors
The following is a list of the number of competitors participating at the Games per sport.

Medalists 

The following Latvian competitors won medals at the games. In the discipline sections below, the medalists' names are bolded.

Alpine skiing

By meeting the basic qualification standards Latvia qualified one male (Miks Edgars Zvejnieks) and one female (Liene Bondare) alpine skier.

Biathlon

Bobsleigh

Men

* – Denotes the driver of the sled

Cross-country skiing

Latvia qualified two male and five female cross-country skiers.

Distance
Men

Women

Sprint

Figure skating

In the 2021 World Figure Skating Championships in Stockholm, Sweden, Latvia secured one quota in the men's competition.

Individual

Ice hockey

Summary
Key:
 OT – Overtime
 GWS – Match decided by penalty-shootout

Latvia has qualified 28 male competitors to the ice hockey tournament.

Men's tournament

Latvia men's national ice hockey team qualified by winning the final qualification tournament.

Team roster

Group play

Playoffs

Nordic combined

Luge

Based on the results from the 2021–22 Luge World Cup season, Latvia qualified 8 sleds.

Men

Women

Mixed team relay

Short track speed skating

Latvia has qualified two male short track speed skaters.

Skeleton

Speed skating

Individual

Mass start

See also
Latvia at the Olympics
Latvia at the 2022 Winter Paralympics

References

Nations at the 2022 Winter Olympics
2022
Winter Olympics